Anton Persson (born January 4, 1989 in Gävle) is a Swedish ice hockey player. He was playing with Brynäs IF in the Elitserien. He is currently playing with Tønsberg Vikings in the Norwegian First Division.

References

External links

1989 births
Living people
People from Gävle
Brynäs IF players
IK Oskarshamn players
Swedish ice hockey forwards
Tønsberg Vikings players
Sportspeople from Gävleborg County